Talking Footy was an Australian rules football television program on the Seven Network broadcast from 1994 to 2004 and 2013–2020. The show was hosted mainly by Bruce McAvaney and Luke Darcy in both runs of the show.

Original format (1994-2004)

The program was first broadcast from 1994 until 2004. It was created by Gary Fenton, the Seven Network's then Director of Sport.

The show was hosted by Bruce McAvaney from 1995 to 1998 and from 2001 to 2002, Tim Lane in 1999, Gerard Healy in 2000 and Tim Watson in 2003 and 2004.

Regular couch members included Mike Sheahan, Malcolm Blight, Terry Wallace, Caroline Wilson and Leigh Matthews.

It was initially screened on Monday evening at 8:30 pm in 1995, then on Monday at 10:30 pm for the remainder of it run. In 2004 it was shown late on Tuesday nights. The program struggled in the last few years due to the network not having the rights to broadcast the AFL while also having poor ratings, the show was axed in 2004.

New format (2013-2020)
In August 2013, the Seven Network revived the series, which aired on a Thursday night throughout the 2013 final series with Bruce McAvaney, Luke Darcy, Wayne Carey and Andrew Demetriou as panelists.

The following year saw the show return to Monday nights at 7.30 pm on 7mate in Melbourne, Adelaide and Perth, and on delay at midnight the same day in Sydney and Brisbane.

The show is hosted by Luke Darcy with Wayne Carey, Tim Watson and Jacqui Felgate. It is broadcast from Seven's Docklands studios in Melbourne. Other panellist to appear on the program included Brian Taylor, Campbell Brown, Sam McClure and Mick Warner.

In June 2020, the program will be temporarily axed along with AFL Game Day due to the effects of the coronavirus pandemic. The show was confirmed cancelled by Seven's head of sport Lewis Martin in March 2020 with a new “Footy Magazine” set to replace it.

Segments
Various segments on the show include:
"The Blowtorch"
"Inside 50"
"Say That Again"

Parodies
In 2005, comedian Andrew Startin appeared on the rival Nine Network with a send-up of the show on The Footy Show. Gary Ayres was sent up with his catchphrase "at the end of the day" and "You've got your Buckleys, your Hirds, your Ricciutos"; Mike Sheahan with "what do you think?"; and Bruce McAvaney with "Special!".

Theme song
The lyrics to the song are as follows:

The weekend's come and gone,
As we talk up a storm,
'Bout our team, bout our form,
And how it could be.
 
But when Monday comes around,
Talk around the town,
It's what happened on the weekend in the footy.
 
Monday nights, we're Talking Footy.

When the show switched to a Tuesday night timeslot (which led to its demise), the lyrics changed somewhat. During the 2014 relaunch, only the second verse is used.

In the original season, the theme song was "Monday's Experts" by 
Weddings, Parties, Anything.

References

7mate original programming
Seven Sport
Television shows set in Melbourne
Australian rules football television series
1994 Australian television series debuts
2002 Australian television series endings
2013 Australian television series debuts